The Brooklyn Waldorf School is a coeducational, independent, non-sectarian day preschool and elementary Waldorf school located in Bedford-Stuyvesant, Brooklyn, New York. The School operates on the principles of Waldorf Education, and adapts the traditional methods of Rudolf Steiner. The school was founded in 2005 and currently has a Preschool/Kindergarten and Grades 1–8. In 2011, the Brooklyn Waldorf School moved into its new home at the Claver Castle.

Though relatively new to the neighborhood, the Brooklyn Waldorf School strives to maintain an active and mindful presence within Bedford-Stuyvesant through partnerships with local organizations, such as the St. Martin de Porres/St. Peter Claver Parish, and the public events the school organizes, such as Community Basketball nights and various cultural workshops, including social justice training.

The Brooklyn Waldorf School is a “developing status” member of the Association of Waldorf Schools of North America (AWSNA).

See also
Curriculum of the Waldorf schools

References

External links 

Why Waldorf Works

Waldorf schools in the United States
Private elementary schools in Brooklyn